Angunawela/Angunawala is a village in Sri Lanka. It is located within Central Province.
It used to be the home of the Angunawela/Angunawala Walauwa and for the prominent Radala members of the Angunawela/Angunawala Family hailing from the Kandyan Kingdom.

See also
List of towns in Central Province, Sri Lanka

External links

Populated places in Kandy District